Ashok Rohani is an Indian politician and member of the Bharatiya Janata Party. Rohani is a member of the Madhya Pradesh Legislative Assembly from the Jabalpur Cantonment constituency in Jabalpur district. He was also corporator of the Jabalpur Municipal Corporation.

He is son of Ishwardas Rohani who was Speaker of the Madhya Pradesh Legislative Assembly from 2003 to 2013.

References 

Living people
Year of birth missing (living people)
People from Jabalpur
Bharatiya Janata Party politicians from Madhya Pradesh
Madhya Pradesh MLAs 2013–2018
Madhya Pradesh MLAs 2018–2023